Ceryloninae is a subfamily of beetles in the family Cerylonidae.

Genera 
 Acautomus
 Afrorylon
 Angolon
 Australiorylon
 Axiocerylon
 Cautomus
 Cerylon
 Clavicerylon
 Coccilon
 Ellipsorylon
 Elytrotetrantus
 Glomerylon
 Glyptolopus
 Gyrelon
 Ivieus
 Lapethinus
 Lawrenciella
 Lytopeplus
 Mychocerus
 Neolapethus
 Nkolbissonia
 Orientrylon
 Oroussetia
 Pachylon
 Pakalukia
 Paracerylon
 Paraxiocerylon
 Pathelus
 Philothermopsis
 Philothermus
 Ploeosoma
 Pseudocerylon
 Pseudodacne
 Pseudolapethus
 Rostrorylon
 Spinocerylon
 Suakokoia
 Thyroderus

References

External links 
 
 

 
Polyphaga subfamilies